Orculella cretiminuta is a species of air-breathing land snail, a terrestrial pulmonate gastropod mollusc in the family Orculidae.

Geographic distribution
O. cretiminuta is endemic to Greece, where it occurs on the island of Crete and the neighbouring islets of Gavdos, Paximadia, Gianysada and Pseira.

See also
List of non-marine molluscs of Greece

References 

Orculidae
Molluscs of Europe
Endemic fauna of Greece
Gastropods described in 2004